Josef Kopecký (died 1930) was a Czech footballer who played as a midfielder.

Club career
During his playing career, Kopecký played for Meteor Prague.

International career
On 1 April 1906, Kopecký made his debut for Bohemia in Bohemia's second game, starting in a 1–1 draw against Hungary. Kopecký would later make one final appearance for Bohemia on 7 October 1906.

Notes

References

Date of birth unknown
1930 deaths
Association football midfielders
Czech footballers
Czechoslovak footballers
Bohemia international footballers